Group B of the 1993 Federation Cup Europe/Africa Zone was one of five pools in the Europe/Africa zone of the 1993 Federation Cup. Four teams competed in a round robin competition, with the top two teams advancing to the play-offs.

Belgium vs. Ireland

Norway vs. Senegal

Belgium vs. Norway

Ireland vs. Senegal

Belgium vs. Senegal

Ireland vs. Norway

See also
Fed Cup structure

References

External links
 Fed Cup website

1993 Federation Cup Europe/Africa Zone